Methylobacterium cerastii  is a Gram-negative and non-spore-forming bacteria from the genus of Methylobacterium which has been isolated from the surface of a leaf from the plant Cerastium holosteoides in Thüringen in Germany.

References

Further reading

External links
Type strain of Methylobacterium cerastii at BacDive -  the Bacterial Diversity Metadatabase

Hyphomicrobiales
Bacteria described in 2012